Gaselee is a surname. Notable people with the surname include: 

Alfred Gaselee (1844–1918), British Indian Army general
Gaselee Expedition, 1900 expedition, part of the war of the Boxer Rebellion
Stephen Gaselee (diplomat) (1882–1943), British diplomat, writer, and librarian
Stephen Gaselee (judge) (1762–1839), British judge
Stephen Gaselee (serjeant-at-law) (1807–1883), British serjeant-at-law and politician